Nathaniel Hackett (born December 19, 1979) is an American football coach who is the offensive coordinator for the New York Jets of the National Football League (NFL). A former long-time assistant to Doug Marrone, Hackett previously served as the offensive coordinator for the NFL's Green Bay Packers, Jacksonville Jaguars, Buffalo Bills, as well as several positions for the Syracuse Orange in college football from 2010 to 2012. He served as the head coach of the Denver Broncos in 2022, but was fired during the season after a 4–11 record.

Coaching career

Early career
After working as an assistant coach for UC Davis and Stanford, Hackett began his NFL career as a quality coach under Jon Gruden with the Tampa Bay Buccaneers in 2006. He served there for two years before moving to the Buffalo Bills in that same role for the 2008 and 2009 seasons. He worked with quarterbacks such as Bruce Gradkowski, Chris Simms, Jeff Garcia, Ryan Fitzpatrick, and Brian Brohm during those years. In 2010, Hackett was hired by Syracuse as their quarterbacks and tight ends coach under Doug Marrone, who he would later follow to Buffalo and Jacksonville. Hackett was promoted to offensive coordinator the following year.

Buffalo Bills
In 2013, the Bills hired Marrone as their head coach, and Hackett was brought back to Buffalo as the offensive coordinator. With quarterbacks EJ Manuel, Thad Lewis, and Jeff Tuel, the Bills ranked 29th in passing offense that year, but had a prolific running game with halfbacks C. J. Spiller and Fred Jackson. When Kyle Orton took over for Manuel as the Bills' quarterback the following year, the team finished with a more respectable passing offense, but the run game suffered.

Jacksonville Jaguars
Marrone opted out of his contract with the Bills following the 2014 season, and was then hired by the Jacksonville Jaguars as an offensive line and assistant head coach, bringing Hackett with him once again. In 2016, after Marrone was promoted to interim head coach after the firing of Gus Bradley, Hackett was upgraded from quarterbacks coach to interim offensive coordinator after the Jaguars also fired their previous offensive coordinator, Greg Olson. He was confirmed on that position in January 2017.

Working with quarterback Blake Bortles and running back Leonard Fournette, Hackett coordinated the league's best rushing attack in 2017, leading to Jacksonville winning the AFC South and appearing in the AFC Championship game. However, after the Jaguars failed to repeat their success the following year and started 3–8, Hackett was fired by Marrone on November 26, 2018, after the Jaguars lost to the Buffalo Bills 24–21, a move that surprised him.

Green Bay Packers
On January 14, 2019, Hackett was hired by the Green Bay Packers as their offensive coordinator under head coach Matt LaFleur. Hackett, alongside star quarterback Aaron Rodgers, led the Packers to becoming the league's best scoring offense in the 2020 season. Rodgers won back-to-back MVP awards (2020, 2021) with Hackett.

Denver Broncos
On January 27, 2022, Hackett was hired to become the head coach of the Denver Broncos after the team had fired their former head coach Vic Fangio.

In his head-coaching debut against the Seattle Seahawks, Hackett came under scrutiny when the Broncos faced a 4th-and-5 at midfield with over a minute left to play in the fourth quarter. Despite having three timeouts, Hackett decided to let the clock run down to 20 seconds left for a chance at a game-winning 64-yard field goal. The kick by Brandon McManus was wide left as the Broncos lost, 17–16. The next day, Hackett expressed regret in his decision, stating, "Looking back at it, we definitely should have gone for it."

Hackett was again criticized for his clock management in the Broncos' week two matchup against the Houston Texans, a game that Denver would go on to win 16–9. The Broncos subsequently hired Jerry Rosburg to serve as an assistant to Hackett to help him with game and clock management, beginning with their week three matchup against the San Francisco 49ers.

On December 26, with the Broncos sitting at 4–11 following a 51–14 Christmas Day loss to the Los Angeles Rams, Hackett was fired and replaced by interim head coach Jerry Rosburg. He became the fifth head coach to not finish his first season after Lou Holtz in 1976, Pete McCulley in 1978, Bobby Petrino in 2007, and Urban Meyer in 2021.

New York Jets
On January 28, 2023, the New York Jets announced they had hired Hackett as their new offensive coordinator, in the wake of Mike LaFleur's firing.

Head coaching record

Personal life
Hackett and his wife, Megan, have four children together (Lincoln, Micah, Kaylin and Emerson Schaut)

He is the son of former college football and NFL coach Paul Hackett.

While a student at UC Davis, Hackett became a member of Lambda Chi Alpha Fraternity.

References

External links
 Denver Broncos profile

1979 births
Living people
American football linebackers
American football long snappers
Buffalo Bills coaches
Denver Broncos head coaches
Green Bay Packers coaches
Jacksonville Jaguars coaches
National Football League offensive coordinators
New York Jets coaches
Stanford Cardinal football coaches
Syracuse Orange football coaches
Tampa Bay Buccaneers coaches
UC Davis Aggies football coaches
UC Davis Aggies football players